The Fish Woman is a 1932 French film directed by Louis Mercanton and starring Jeanne Fusier-Gir, Marc-Hély and Louis Sindrin.

Cast
 Jeanne Fusier-Gir 
 Marc-Hély 
 Louis Sindrin 
 Louis Mercanton

References

Bibliography 
 Olivier Barrot & Raymond Chirat. Noir et blanc: 250 acteurs du cinéma français, 1930-1960. Flammarion, 2000.

External links 
 

1932 films
1930s French-language films
Films directed by Louis Mercanton
French black-and-white films
1930s French films